The Terminal Link (formerly Link Train) is an automated people mover (APM) at Toronto Pearson International Airport in Mississauga, Ontario, Canada. 
The wheelchair-accessible train runs 24 hours a day, seven days a week and is completely free-of-charge to ride. In 2012, it transported 17,000 passengers daily, 60 to 70% of whom were airport staff.

History
The original proposal for an automated people mover system at Pearson Airport was submitted in May 2002. Six months later, on November 15, 2002, a $55-million contract was signed with DCC Doppelmayr Cable Car GmbH of Wolfurt, Austria, followed by four years of construction, and the system opened to the public on July 6, 2006. The service initially operated alongside its predecessor, the Link shuttle bus system.

The system cost $150 million.

Design and rolling stock
The Terminal Link uses a pair of Cable Liner trains. They use a cable-hauled, drive and tension system. Each train has capacity for 175 passengers with baggage (25 per car: 17 standing, 8 seated) or 2,500 passengers per hour per direction (pphpd).

 Married set formed of cars ++++++ 
 Married set formed of cars ++++++ 

The two trains, plus a small work car, cost a total of  when delivered. They were refurbished in 2013, and received a new paint scheme, new seats, and a seventh car (they were originally delivered and used as six-car trains).

Stations and operation 
They serve three stations:
 Terminal 1
 Terminal 3
 Viscount (long-term parking on Airport Road)

Both lines operate independently in shuttle mode with a total capacity of up to 2,180 pphpd. The trains run on rubber tires on a smooth steel surface and all propulsion is provided by the cable. The absence of onboard motors, braking systems and gearboxes eliminates excessive noise, oil spills from the trains, and dust from brakes. Doppelmayr asserts that a cable-driven APM is the most environmentally responsible solution for transportation in high density applications.

Disruptions
On March 30, 2009, the Link Train was put out of service for extensive maintenance due to engineering design flaws. During this time, service was replaced by an inter-terminal shuttle bus contracted to Penetang-Midland Coach Lines. Normal service resumed in July 2009.

On March 16, 2013, the Link Train was shut down for approximately eight months during construction of the Union Pearson Express. The trains were refurbished during this time and received a seventh car, new seats, and a new paint scheme.

Connections
The Union Pearson Express airport rail link service between Pearson Airport and Union Station in Downtown Toronto opened on June 6, 2015, in time for the 2015 Pan American Games. It directly serves Terminal 1, with a connection to Terminal 3 via the Terminal Link.

A number of public transport bus services in the GTA have a stop on the lower level of Terminal 1; these include the Toronto Transit Commission (TTC), MiWay, Brampton Transit, and GO Transit. The TTC has an additional stop on the lower level at Terminal 3, served after departing Terminal 1.

As originally proposed, Line 5 Eglinton was to connect Pearson Airport with Scarborough by 2018 as part of the Transit City plan. However, when the four Transit City lines were found to be $2.4 billion over their funding envelope in January 2010, parts of the network were deferred, including the western section of the Eglinton LRT. A future extension could eventually reach the airport, completing the line as envisioned. As of 2020 planning for the western extension is underway and Metrolinx hopes to complete the line by 2030–31.

References

External links

 
 Doppelmayr Cable Car, designer's webpage
 Airport People Mover technical data
 Airport People Mover System
 Doppelmayr/Garaventa Group, parent company of DCC

Transport in the Greater Toronto Area
Light rail in Canada
Passenger rail transport in Mississauga
Airport people mover systems
Cable Liner people movers
Toronto Pearson International Airport
People mover systems in Canada
Railway lines opened in 2006
2006 establishments in Ontario
Electric railways in Canada